The following is a list of characters that first appeared in the New Zealand soap opera Shortland Street in 1995, by order of first appearance.

Lulu Chatfield

Lulu Chatfield first arrived in early 1995, having become good friends with Stuart Neilson (Martin Henderson) after his short holiday away from Ferndale. It was soon revealed Lulu was a teenage runaway, having been sexually abused by her father. Stuart's mother Marj (Elizabeth McRae) fostered Lulu alongside her husband Laurie (Chich Littlewood) and Lulu became good friends with Minnie Crozier (Katrina Devine). Lulu began to date James Thornton (Chris Dykzeul) but was devastated when her father was acquitted of his charges of molestation and tried to hunt her down. He was arrested and Lulu broke up with James when he kissed Minnie. In 1996 Lulu departed with Marj and Laurie to live in Wellington.

Craig Develter

Craig Develter appeared in two stints in 1995 and 1996, portrayed by Joel Tobeck. Craig was a friend of Otis Jackson's (Shane Bartle) but this changed when a drunk Otis crashed the car the two were traveling in. Craig was seriously injured and lost the use of his legs, becoming a wheelchair user The clinic staff soon realised the true manipulative nature of Craig when he began to blackmail and emotionally torture Otis as payback for his injuries. Craig returned the following year in a much better mindset having adjusted to his restrictions. However his disdain for the "system" was still apparent and he revealed secrets to manipulate the seriousness of paraplegia to the newly injured Rangi Heremaia (Blair Strang).

The "bad-ass, wheelchair-bound drug dealer" portrayal of Craig was later identified as, "one of the show's more memorable characters" by a reviewer from The New Zealand Herald.

Zac Smith

Zac Smith arrived in a guest role in mid 1995 as the potential love interest for Grace Kwan (Lynette Forday). He returned several months later when he was revealed as the illegitimate half brother of James Thornton (Chris Dykzeul) before he embarked on a scandalous storyline where he dated James' mother and recent widow - Julia Thornton (Elizabeth Hawthorne). Zac returned in 2002 and in a more central role in 2012.

Tuesday Warner

Tuesday Warner first appeared in late 1995 when she was born to parents - Carmen Roberts (Theresa Healey) and Guy Warner (Craig Parker) in a storm. The following year Tuesday was diagnosed with a brain tumour and she and Guy were forced to go to America for it to be operated on. The two returned 11 years later and it was soon clear to Guy's brother Chris (Michael Galvin), that Tuesday was covering up Guy's drug addiction. They fled Ferndale but upon their return 6 months later, got into a devastating car crash. Tuesday began to attend high school and developed a crush on Wiremu Potae (Scott Cotter) but it was unrequited and she ended up returning to America with Guy.

Emily Devine

References

1995
, Shortland Street